4-amino-4-deoxychorismate lyase is an enzyme that participates in folate biosynthesis by catalyzing the production of PABA by the following reaction

4-amino-4-deoxychorismate  4-aminobenzoate + pyruvate

This enzyme belongs to the family of lyases, specifically the oxo-acid-lyases, which cleave carbon-carbon bonds.  This enzyme, encoded by the pabC gene in bacteria and plants, is also known as PabC or ADC lyase.  The fungal enzyme has been designated ABZ2.

All known examples of 4-amino-4-deoxychorismate lyase bind PLP (pyridoxal-5'-phosphate), a cofactor employed during catalysis.

References

 
 
  Link to article.
 
 
 

EC 4.1.3